Corinne Cuéllar-Nathan (born 1958 in Zurich) is a Swiss painter.

Life 
Cuéllar-Nathan was born in Zurich into a family immersed in the world of art. Both her parents, Dr. Peter Nathan and Barbara Nathan-Neher, were  art dealers and art collectors. In the mid 1980s she attended the City & Guilds of London Art School. Subsequently, she studied and completed her training at the Akademie für bildende Künste in Vienna, Austria. Her studies led her to become a paper restorer after further training in Italy. After 1997, however, painting became the central facet of her work.

Art 
Cuéllar-Nathan is famous for her landscape and cityscape paintings. She has travelled around the world with her easels and canvases, sometimes accompanied by sherpas, sometimes by family members and sometimes by mountaineers, but most of the time alone to places such as, Nepal, Spain, New York, Colombia, and Italy to find the right location and the right light. Always painted en plain air, her art is rooted in her search for perfection as well as her search for outstanding quality. The result is an effortless, atmospheric work that differs from one painting to the next. In her work, the perceiver and the perceived are over greater length of time an intertwined entity, constantly in communication in which traditional and moral values fade in and out of focus and ultimately marking the perceiver with a sense of serenity and sincerity, first captured with the eye and brush of the artist.

Exhibitions 
Corinne Cuéllar-Nathan has had solo exhibitions around the world.

 2015	Zurich	The Power of Landscapes: Horizons of the Eye an Mind, Art Cuéllar Nathan
 2014	Basel	Contemporary & Contemporary, Galerie Jean-Francois Heim
 2013	Südtirol	Art and Tradition, Schloss Churburg
 2012	Paris	La Mer, Galerie Didier Aaron
 2012	Zurich	Landscapes, Fine Art Zürich, Kongresshaus Zürich
 2004	London	Colour and Light, Colnaghi 
 2003	Austria	The Alps, Schlosskammer in Maishofen
 2003	Switzerland	In Erinnerung an J. Neumayer, Unterengadin
 2002	New York	Vanitas, Jill Newhouse Gallery
 2001	Zurich	Industry and Nature: A Juxtraposition, Galerie Zäune
 2000	Paris	Lumière, Antione Béchet
 1999	New York	Land an Cityscapes, Jill Newhouse Gallery

Catalogues 
 Corinne Cuellar, The Power of Landscapes: Horizons of the Eye and Mind, Exhibition Catalogue
 Corinne Cuellar, Reflet d'Eau, Didier Aaron & Cie., Exhibition Catalogue
 Corinne Cuellar, Colour and Light, Colnaghi, Exhibition Catalogue
 Corinne Cuellar, Lumière, Isabelle Renaud, Atelier Antoine Béchet, Exhibition Catalogue

External links 
 http://www.artcuellarnathan.com/about/corinne-cuellar/

1958 births
Living people
20th-century Swiss women artists
21st-century Swiss women artists
Alumni of the City and Guilds of London Art School
Artists from Zürich
Swiss women painters
Swiss contemporary artists